This is a list of parks and open spaces in Copenhagen, Denmark.

Indre By (city centre)
Parks and open spaces in the Indre By district of Copenhagen:

Amager
Parks and open spaces in the Amager Øst and Amager Vest districts of Copenhagen:

Bispebjerg
Parks and open spaces in the Valby district of Copenhagen:

Brønshøj-Husum
Parks and open spaces in the Brønshøj and Husum districts of Copenhagen:

Frederiksberg
Parks and open spaces in Frederiksberg Municipality:

Nørrebro
Parks and open spaces in the Nørrebro district of Copenhagen:

Østerbro

Parks and open spaces in Frederiksberg Municipality:

Valby
Parks and open spaces in the Valby district of Copenhagen:

Vesterbro/Kongens Enghave
Parks and open spaces in the Vesterbro and Kongens Enghave districts of Copenhagen:

Suburbs

Gentofte Municipality

See also
 List of squares in Copenhagen

References

 
Copenhagen